Newport Academy is an American mental health treatment program for teens and young adults. It was founded in 2009 by Jamison Monroe with residential, outpatient, and day school locations in the United States.

History
Newport Academy was founded in May 2009 by Jamison Monroe, who as a young teenager had been in rehab programs for depression, anxiety, and substance abuse issues. Newport Academy is a mental health treatment program for depression, anxiety, and trauma-related issues and addiction.

In 2012, Newport Academy received approval from the Commission on Accreditation of Rehabilitation Facilities. Newport’s facilities are accredited by The Joint Commission.

In July and August 2013 a judge sent Ethan Couch for teen substance abuse and mental health rehabilitation to Newport Academy.

Treatment methods
Newport Academy use a number of therapies to treat mental health issues, substance abuse, and eating disorders. Although the Port Townsend,Washington facility (along with possible others) may not be able to help with severe eating disorders.  Among the forms of treatment are dialectical behavioral therapy(DBT), acceptance and commitment therapy (ACT), music therapy, Attachment-Based Family Therapy (ABFT), nutritional counseling, one-on-one therapy, art therapy, equine therapy, meditation, and culinary arts.

Programs and facilities
Newport Academy has locations in Connecticut, California, Washington, Utah, Texas, Georgia, Virginia, Maryland, Pennsylvania, Minnesota, Wisconsin and North Carolina. Average length of stay in the residential programs is 60-90 days, while for outpatient programs is 60 days to one year.

References

External links
Newportacademy.com

Therapeutic boarding schools in the United States
Educational institutions established in 2009
2009 establishments in the United States